Dennis Marwin Koslowski (born August 16, 1959) is an American amateur wrestler and professional wrestler. He was born in Watertown, South Dakota. He was Olympic bronze medalist in Greco-Roman wrestling in 1988, and won a silver medal in 1992. In 2009, he was inducted into the National Wrestling Hall of Fame as a Distinguished Member.

Koslowski is a graduate of the University of Minnesota Morris, where he was a stand-out wrestler along with twin brother Duane. He was a two time NCAA Division III national champion, two-time Northern Intercollegiate Conference champion and a three-time NCAA III All-American; he also played football as an offensive linesman. He is a member of the University of Minnesota Morris and Northern Sun Intercollegiate Conference Hall of Fame.

Koslowski briefly competed as a professional wrestler for Japanese shoot style promotion UWF International. On December 20, 1992, he fought UWFi's top star Nobuhiko Takada in a losing effort at Ryōgoku Kokugikan. He wrestled a further eight time, with his final match coming almost a year later on December 5, 1993, where he lost to Kiyoshi Tamura.

Since retiring from sports, Koslowski works as a chiropractor for his own practice.

References

1959 births
Living people
Sportspeople from South Dakota
Wrestlers at the 1988 Summer Olympics
Wrestlers at the 1992 Summer Olympics
American male sport wrestlers
Olympic silver medalists for the United States in wrestling
Olympic bronze medalists for the United States in wrestling
Medalists at the 1992 Summer Olympics
Medalists at the 1988 Summer Olympics
People from Watertown, South Dakota
Pan American Games medalists in wrestling
Pan American Games silver medalists for the United States
Wrestlers at the 1983 Pan American Games
Wrestlers at the 1987 Pan American Games
World Wrestling Championships medalists
American male professional wrestlers
University of Minnesota Morris alumni
20th-century American people
21st-century American people